Sogliano is an Italian placename and surname.

Giovanni Antonio Sogliani (1492 – 1544) - Florentine painter

Places in Italy
Sogliano al Rubicone – in the province of Forlì-Cesena
Sogliano Cavour – in the province of Forlì-Cesena-Lecce